The Chamber Music Conference and Composers' Forum of the East (CMC) is a summer conference that brings together amateur musicians, professional faculty, and composers-in-residence to study and play chamber music. The CMC was founded in 1946, and most of its summer sessions have been held at Bennington College in Bennington, Vermont. After the 2019 session, the CMC announced its relocation to the campus of Colgate University in Hamilton, New York, to begin with its 75th anniversary session in 2022. There was a limited 2021 program at Bennington College. (The 2020 in-person program was canceled due to the COVID-19 pandemic.)

History
The conference was founded in 1946 as a program of Middlebury College. Alan Carter, founder and director, was a professor of music at Middlebury. He was also the founder and music director of the Vermont Symphony Orchestra (then the Vermont State Symphony Orchestra).

Conference program
Throughout the conference week, participants attend coaching sessions on assigned chamber music works. They may also attend lectures and seminars. Composers-in-residence are commissioned to write new works that are played by participants and faculty during the conference weeks. The faculty present free performances that are open to the public.

Notable CMC composers-in-residence
 Esther Williamson Ballou
 Lisa Bielawa
 Henry Brant
 Louis Calabro
 Chou Wen-chung
 Donald Crockett - Senior Composer-in-Residence, beginning 2002 
 Ingolf Dahl
 Mario Davidovsky
 Donald Erb
 Gabriela Lena Frank
 Roger Goeb
 Jennifer Higdon
 Hannah Lash
 Otto Luening
 Paul Moravec
 Jeffrey Mumford
 Lionel Nowak
 George Rochberg
 Frederic Rzewski
 Allen Shawn
 Halsey Stevens
 Theodore Strongin
 Virgil Thomson
 Joan Tower
 Vladimir Ussachevsky
 Edgard Varèse
 Charles Wuorinen
 Chen Yi

Notable CMC faculty
Phillip Bush - Music Director, 2007-2016
 Alan Carter - Music Director, 1946-1975
 Jack Glick - Music Director, 1982-1994
 Shem Guibbory - Music Director, 1998-2007
 Kermit Moore
 Maxine Neuman
 Bertram Turetzky
Tobias Werner - Music Director, 2016 - present

References

Chamber music festivals